Charaxes alpinus, the montane charaxes, is a butterfly in the family Nymphalidae. It is found in eastern Zimbabwe.

Description
Larger than the closely related Charaxes ethalion with shorter and more robust tails; underside darker and more reddish brown  The habitat consists of montane forests in the Eastern Highlands.

Biology
Adults are on wing year round.

The larvae feed on Albizia adianthifolia.

Taxonomy
Charaxes alpinus is a member of the large species group Charaxes etheocles.

References

Victor Gurney Logan Van Someren, 1966 Revisional notes on African Charaxes (Lepidoptera: Nymphalidae). Part III. Bulletin of the British Museum (Natural History) (Entomology) 45-101.

External links
Charaxes alpinus images at Consortium for the Barcode of Life 
African Butterfly Database Range map via search

Butterflies described in 1957
alpinus
Endemic fauna of Zimbabwe
Butterflies of Africa